Mithridates II of the Bosporus, also known as Mithridates of Pergamon (flourished 1st century BC), was a nobleman from Anatolia. Mithridates was one of the sons born to King Mithridates VI of Pontus from his mistress, the Galatian Princess Adobogiona the Elder. He also had a full-blooded sister called Adobogiona the Younger. The Pontic prince was of Persian, Macedonian and Galatian ancestry.

Early life 
His father sent Mithridates to Pergamon to be educated, where he became a leading citizen of that city. Mithridates was a tetrarch over the Trocmi tribe.

Roman Civil War 
In the winter of 48/47 BC, Julius Caesar was under siege in Alexandria by the armies of Achillas, guardian and general for King Ptolemy XIII Theos Philopator.  Mithridates raised an army and came to Caesar's relief. In the aftermath of the Battle of Zela, Caesar made him king of the Bosporan Kingdom. Mithridates's niece Dynamis and her husband Asander were the ruling monarchs at the time, and were defeated by Mithridates's army.

Reign as King of the Bosporus 
Mithridates reign was short-lived, as Asander defeated him in 47/46 BC. Apparently, Mithridates died shortly after that. Sometime between 27 and 17 BC, Augustus formally recognised Asander as king of Bosporus.

Culture 
Mithridates was portrayed by Furio Meniconi in the 1963 film Cleopatra.

See also
Bosporan Kingdom
Roman Crimea

References

Sources
 Mayor, Adrienne: "The Poison King: The Life and Legend of Mithradates, Rome's Deadliest Enemy" Princeton: Princeton University Press, 2009, 

Monarchs of the Bosporan Kingdom
People from Pergamon
1st-century BC rulers
Iranian people of Greek descent
1st-century BC Iranian people
Mithridatic dynasty